AMC-12 (formerly GE-1i) is an American geostationary communications satellite that was launched by a Proton-M / Briz-M launch vehicle at 02:27:32 UTC on 3 February 2005. The  satellite to provide voice and video services to the North America and South America, Europe, and Africa through separate beams to each region, after parking over the Atlantic Ocean through its 72 C-band transponders, over 37° West longitude.

Worldsat 2 
In early 2004, AMC 12 was transferred to Worldsat LLC, a new subsidiary of SES Americom as Worldsat 2. In early 2005, few weeks before launch, it was renamed AMC 12 again.

Astra 4A 
24 transponders on AMC 12 have been contracted by SES Astra which to market this capacity in Africa under the name Astra 4A.

Star One C12 
18 transponders are operated by Star One as Star One C12 for Europe.

NSS 10 
In March 2009, the satellite was transferred to SES New Skies and named NSS 10.

AMC-13 
AMC-13 (formerly GE-2i) was cancelled.

References

External links 
 Satélite Star One
 NSS 10 (AMC-12)
 Channels of Star One C12

Communications satellites in geosynchronous orbit
Spacecraft launched in 2005
SES satellites